International Shariah Research Academy for Islamic Finance (ISRA) is an Islamic finance research institution in Malaysia that focuses on sharia-related issues 

ISRA was established on 26 March 2008 by the Central Bank Malaysia (BNM)

Background 
ISRA is a repository of knowledge for Shari’ah views (fatwas) and undertakes studies on contemporary issues, especially those relating to Shari’ah, in the Islamic finance industry. ISRA also contributes towards strengthening human capital development in Shari’ah expertise relevant to Islamic finance and provides a platform for greater engagement amongst practitioners, scholars, regulators and academics via research and dialogue, in both the domestic and international arenas.

Objectives 
 Spearhead and Conduct Applied Shari’ah Research in Islamic Finance 
 Enrich Resources of Knowledge in Islamic Finance 
 Provide Avenues for the Development of Shari’ah Practice In Islamic Finance 
 Propagate Harmonisation and Mutual Respect in Islamic Finance Practices

Key Specialisation 
 Shari'ah and Applied Research 
 Publications 
 Events 
 Talent Development

Shari'ah and Applied Research 
 Islamic Banking Unit
 Islamic Capital Market Unit
 Takaful Unit
 Fatwa and Translation Unit

Publication

Books 
 ISRA Research Papers
 ISRA International Journal of Islamic Finance (English)
 ISRA International Journal of Islamic Finance (Arabic)
 Articles

Proceedings 
 ISRA Islamic Finance Space (IIFS)
 ISRA Bulletins
 ISRA-Bloomberg Bulletins

Events 
  ISRA International Shariah Scholars' Forum (ISSF)
 ISRA Muzakarah Cendekiawan Syariah Nusantara (MCSN)
 ISRA-IRTI-Durham University Strategic Roundtable Discussion (SRD)
 ISRA International Colloquium for Islamic Finance (IICIF)
 ISRA Thematic Workshops

Talent Development Programmes 
 In-House Shari'ah Management Training Programme
 Practical Training and Fellowship Programme
 Shari'ah Scholarship

External links
Bank Negara Malaysia
Malaysia International Islamic Financial Centre
INCEIF
Islamic Finance Knowledge Repository (I-FIKR)
Association of Shariah Advisor in Islamic Finance Malaysia (ASAS)

Islamic economic jurisprudence
Islamic banking
Sharia
Research institutes in Malaysia